Hans Stenberg (3 July 1953 – 27 August 2016) was a Swedish politician. He was a Social Democratic member of the Riksdag from 1991 to 2010.

References

1953 births
2016 deaths
Members of the Riksdag from the Social Democrats
Members of the Riksdag 2002–2006
Members of the Riksdag 1991–1994
Members of the Riksdag 1994–1998
Members of the Riksdag 1998–2002
Members of the Riksdag 2006–2010
20th-century Swedish politicians
21st-century Swedish politicians